Kipsigak is a village near Kapsabet in Nandi County, Kenya. Administratively, Kipsigak is a location in Kilibwoni division of Nandi County. Its local authority is Kapsabet municipality and constituency is Emgwen.

It is the birthplace of Kenyan runner Augustine Kiprono Choge.

References 

Populated places in Nandi County